The Boarding School of Humanities for Gifted Children is a Tatar state gymnasium (secondary school) and boarding school located in Aktanysh, Tatarstan, Russia. Founded in 2005 as a municipal school, the status was changed in 2011. Unlike other secondary schools in Republic of Tatarstan, it is managed at the state rather than municipal level and is directly subordinate to the Ministry of Education and Science of Republic of Tatarstan.

All programs follow state educational standards. The school has exchange programs with other educational institutions of different countries.

Gallery

References 

Schools in Russia
Boarding schools in Russia